KJ's Market is a supermarket chain operating primarily in South Carolina. It is owned by Lowes Foods. kJ's supermarket has an annual revenue of $356,000,000.

History
KJ's Market first opened in Florence, South Carolina in 2006.

On September 1, 2020, it was announced that the chain acquired 20 former BI-LO locations from Southeastern Grocers. In 2021, the stores were rebranded as KJ's, IGA and Lowes Foods.

References

General references

</ref>

External links

2006 establishments in South Carolina
Companies based in South Carolina
Retail companies established in 2006
Supermarkets of the United States
American companies established in 2006